Ouyang Jingling (born 27 November 1987) is a Paralympic athlete from China who competes in throwing events for F37 classification athletes.

Athletic career
Ouyang became involved in sport in 2002, after her father noticed a talent and took her to a training session. She competed at the 2004 Summer Paralympics in Athens, entering the 100m and 200m sprint and the long jump, though she did not win a medal. Her first major international success came at the 2006 IPC Athletics World Championships in Assen where she won a silver medal in the 100 metre sprint (T46). Although she was not in the China team for her home Paralympic Games in Beijing, she did represent her country at the 2012 Summer Paralympics in London, winning a bronze medal in the long jump.

Personal career
Ouyang was born in Chenzhou, China in 1987. An accident with a firecracker at the age of nine resulted in her right arm being amputated.

References

1987 births
Paralympic athletes of China
Paralympic bronze medalists for China
Living people
Chinese female sprinters
Chinese female long jumpers
Medalists at the 2012 Summer Paralympics
Athletes (track and field) at the 2004 Summer Paralympics
Athletes (track and field) at the 2012 Summer Paralympics
People from Chenzhou
Runners from Hunan
Paralympic medalists in athletics (track and field)
21st-century Chinese women